Jaft Do Pa (also Romanized as Jaft Do Pā) is a village in Kuh Yakhab Rural District, Dastgerdan District, Tabas County, South Khorasan Province, Iran. At the 2006 census, its population was 25, in 7 families.

References 

Populated places in Tabas County